Candy Reynolds and Paula Smith won in the final 6–2, 6–2 against Iwona Kuczyńska and Trey Lewis.

Seeds
Champion seeds are indicated in bold text while text in italics indicates the round in which those seeds were eliminated.

 Candy Reynolds /  Paula Smith (champions)
 Patricia Medrado /  Cláudia Monteiro (quarterfinals)
 Barbara Jordan /  Betsy Nagelsen (semifinals)
 Anne Hobbs /  Susan Leo (semifinals)

Draw

External links
 1983 Pittsburgh Open Doubles Draw

Doubles